Rickels is a surname. Notable people with the surname include:

 David Rickels (born 1989), American martial artist
 Laurence A. Rickels (born 1954), American literary and media theorist

See also
 Rickel